The 2018 Rugby Europe Women’s U18 Sevens Championship was a qualifier for the 2018 Summer Youth Olympics in Buenos Aires, Argentina. The tournament was the fifth edition and was again held in Vichy France. Great Britain was the top seeded side and the favourites to win the competition but lost to France in the final 22–0.

Teams

Pool stages

Pool A

Pool B

Pool C

Pool D

Finals 
Shield

Challenge Trophy

5/8th Place Playoff

Cup

Final standings

References 

2017–18 in European women's rugby union